The 2017–18 CAA men's basketball season will mark the 33rd season of Colonial Athletic Association basketball, taking place between November 2017 and March 2018.  Practices will commence in October 2017, and the season will end with the 2018 CAA men's basketball tournament.

Head coaches

Coaching changes
On March 17, 2017, head coach Kevin Keatts left UNC Wilmington to accept the head coaching position at NC State. On April 3, 2017, UNC Wilmington announced that C.B. McGrath was hired to replace Kevin Keatts as head coach.

Coaches 

Notes: 
 All records, appearances, titles, etc. are from time with current school only. 
 Year at school includes 2017–18 season.
 Overall and CAA records are from time at current school and are through the end of the 2016–17 season.

Preseason

Preseason poll
Source

() first place votes

Preseason All-Conference Teams
Source

Colonial Athletic Association Preseason Player of the Year: Joe Chealey (Charleston)

Regular season

Head coaches
 Earl Grant, Charleston
 Martin Ingelsby, Delaware
 Zach Spiker, Drexel
 Matt Matheny, Elon
 Joe Mihalich, Hofstra
 Louis Rowe, James Madison
 Bill Coen, Northeastern
 Pat Skerry, Towson
 C.B. McGrath, UNC Wilmington
 Tony Shaver, William & Mary

Rankings

Conference matrix
This table summarizes the head-to-head results between teams in conference play.

Postseason

Colonial Athletic Association tournament

  March 3–6, 2017: Colonial Athletic Association Men's Basketball Tournament, North Charleston Coliseum, North Charleston, South Carolina

NCAA tournament

The CAA had one bid to the 2018 NCAA Division I men's basketball tournament, that being the automatic bid of College of Charleston by winning the conference tournament.

National Invitation tournament

College Basketball Invitational

CollegeInsider.com Postseason tournament

Awards and honors

Regular season

CAA Player-of-the-Week

 Nov. 13 – Ryan Daly (Delaware)
 Nov. 20 – Eli Pemberton (Hofstra)
 Nov. 27 – Mike Morsell (Towson), David Cohn (William & Mary)
 Dec. 4  – Connor Burchfield (William & Mary), Tramaine Isabell (Drexel)
 Dec. 11 – Justin Wright-Foreman (Hofstra)
 Dec. 18 – Stuckey Mosley (James Madison), Justin Wright-Foreman (Hofstra)(2)
 Dec. 26 – Grant Riller (Charleston)
 Jan. 2  – Nathan Knight (William & Mary)
 Jan. 8  – Nathan Knight (William & Mary)(2)
 Jan. 15 – Justin Wright-Foreman (Hofstra)(3)
 Jan. 22 – Joe Chealey (Charleston)
 Jan. 29 – Tramaine Isabell (Drexel)(2), Zane Martin (Towson)
 Feb. 5  – Joe Chealey (Charleston)(2), Tyler Seibring (Elon)
 Feb. 12 – Devontae Cacok (UNCW), Grant Riller (Charleston)(2)
 Feb. 19 – Grant Riller (Charleston)(3)
 Feb. 26 – David Cohn (William & Mary)(2), Tramaine Isabell (Drexel)(3)

CAA Rookie-of-the-Week

 Nov. 13 – Tomas Murphy (Northeastern)
 Nov. 20 – Jarvis Doles (Drexel)
 Nov. 27 – Matt Lewis (James Madison)
 Dec. 4  – Ryan Allen (Delaware)
 Dec. 11 – Jalen Ray (Hofstra)
 Dec. 18 – Kevin Anderson (Delaware)
 Dec. 26 – Kevin Anderson (Delaware)(2)
 Jan. 2  – Vasa Pusica (Northeastern)
 Jan. 8  – Matt Lewis (James Madison)(2)
 Jan. 15 – Tomas Murphy (Northeastern)(2)
 Jan. 22 – Darius Banks (James Madison)
 Jan. 29 – Matt Lewis (James Madison)(3)
 Feb. 5  – Ryan Allen (Delaware)(2)
 Feb. 12 – Ryan Allen (Delaware)(3)
 Feb. 19 – Matt Lewis (James Madison)(4)
 Feb. 26 – Jalen Ray (Hofstra)(2)

Postseason

CAA All-Conference Teams and Awards

Attendance

References